The Konstantinopolsky Opening is a rarely played chess opening that begins with the moves as illustrated below:

1. e4 e5
2. Nf3 Nc6
3. g3

Description
The opening was first played in the game Alexander Konstantinopolsky versus Viacheslav Ragozin, Moscow 1956.

The Konstantinopolsky Opening is rarely seen at the top levels of chess, although some grandmasters such as Savielly Tartakower (who played many unusual openings) have experimented with it. Black is considered to achieve an easy game with the natural and strong 3...Nf6 4.d3 d5.

See also
 List of chess openings
 List of chess openings named after people

References

Chess openings
1956 in chess